The 2021–22 Coupe de France preliminary rounds, Paris-Île-de-France was the qualifying competition to decide which teams from the leagues of the Paris-Île-de-France region of France took part in the main competition from the seventh round.

A total of eleven teams qualified from the Paris-Île-de-France preliminary rounds. In 2020–21, Red Star progressed furthest in the main competition, reaching the round of 16 before narrowly losing against Lyon on penalties.

Draws and fixtures
On 27 July 2021, the league announced that 485 clubs from the region had entered the competition. It was also announced that 360 district level clubs would enter at the first round stage, with 8 exempt to the second round stage.

First round
These matches were played on 29 August 2021.

Second round
These matches were played on 5 September 2021, with one postponed until 12 September 2021 due to the first round replay.

Third round
These matches were played on 18 and 19 September 2021.

Fourth round
These matches were played on 2 and 3 October 2021, with one postponed until 10 October 2021.

Fifth round
These matches were played on 16 and 17 October 2021.

Sixth round
These matches were played on 30 and 31 October 2021.

References

preliminary rounds